National Religious Freedom Party is a minor political party based in Kwazulu-Natal, South Africa.

The party advocates support for traditional leaders, and has been active in campaigning against the dissolution of the Ingonyama Trust.

The party contested the 2019 South African general election at provincial level in Kwazulu-Natal only.

Election results

Provincial elections

! rowspan=2 | Election
! colspan=2 | Eastern Cape
! colspan=2 | Free State
! colspan=2 | Gauteng
! colspan=2 | Kwazulu-Natal
! colspan=2 | Limpopo
! colspan=2 | Mpumalanga
! colspan=2 | North-West
! colspan=2 | Northern Cape
! colspan=2 | Western Cape
|-
! % !! Seats
! % !! Seats
! % !! Seats
! % !! Seats
! % !! Seats
! % !! Seats
! % !! Seats
! % !! Seats
! % !! Seats
|-
! 2019
| - || -
| - || -
| - || -
| 0.02% || 0/80
| - || -
| - || -
| - || -
| - || -
| - || -
|}

References

Political parties in South Africa